Burdette is an unincorporated community in the Greenbrier County of West Virginia, United States.

References

Unincorporated communities in Greenbrier County, West Virginia
Unincorporated communities in West Virginia